Prisoner reentry is the process by which prisoners who have been released return to the community. Many types of programs have been implemented with the goal of reducing recidivism and have been found to be effective for this purpose. Consideration for the conditions of the communities formerly incarcerated individuals are re-entering, which are often disadvantaged, is a fundamental part of successful re-entry.

A 2006 study done by the Manpower Demonstration Research Corporation statistically evaluated the effectiveness of prisoner reentry programs on the criteria scale of working, not working, promising, and unknown. Findings classify employment-oriented programs as working, drug rehabilitation programs as working, educational programs as promising, and halfway house programs as working.

A 2015 article from The New York Times Magazine commented, "It wasn't until the mid-2000s that this looming 'prisoner re-entry crisis' became a fixation of sociologists and policy makers, generating a torrent of research, government programs, task forces, nonprofit initiatives and conferences now known as the 're-entry movement'." At the end of 2001, there were approximately 5.6 million U.S. adults who had been in the incarceration system. By the end of 2004, more than 3% of U.S. adults were incarcerated or on probation or parole. With prisons becoming overcrowded, there is more political focus on depopulating prisons. In 2016, approximately 600,000 individuals were released from prison and millions were in and out of county jail systems.

The abrupt re-entrance into society means formerly incarcerated individuals require support to reintegrate. The United States federal government allocates some funding for re-entry programs, but there is currently a lack of sufficient resources. Re-entry programs are now receiving more attention from public policy and criminal justice scholars.

Resources for prisoner re-entry programs 
In the past few decades, correctional institutions have seen a shift, with prisoners serving indeterminate sentences and release being assessed by parole boards, to offenders being released from prison after serving determinate sentences. However, those released are not receiving sufficient preparation for returning to their communities due to limited in-prison and post-release reentry programs; this inadequate structure for re-entry directly influences the possibility of recidivism, also referred to as the "revolving door". United States spending for corrections is approximately $80 billion a year, with re-entry receiving the least amount of fiscal attention relative to other parts of the criminal justice system process. From 2001 to 2004, the United States' federal government allocated over $100 million for reentry programs. Without increased resources for this target area proportional to that spent on control-oriented aspects of incarceration, the issue that remains is the expansion of access and participation for inmates. While the area of reentry program development is still growing, assessments demonstrate their efficacy for transitioning ex-offenders back into society and reducing recidivism. The potential for well-resourced reentry program has yet to be realized, but public policy and criminal justice scholars believe this to be a deserving area for funding to be re-allocated and prioritized.

Kinds of re-entry programs 
There are different types of re-entry programs. They can focus on assisting with employment, securing stable housing, or providing healthcare services. Some programs serve sub-sectors of the formerly incarcerated population such as women or juveniles.

Employment 
With approximately 2 million people incarcerated, the prison population constitutes a large portion of the U.S. labor force. An essential argument for putting prisoners to work is in-prison productivity translating to preparation for entering the workforce post-release. Prison labor is cost-effective for tax payers, allows prisoners to contribute to their families from inside through the generation of income, and can be a form of restorative justice for victims. Poor resources and a prison infrastructure unfit for large-scale labor serve as barriers for establishing effective employment re-entry programs in-prison and post-release, which would include making livable wages, vocational training, education, and skill development accessible to the U.S. prison population. Current funding levels only have the capacity to provide a small percentage of prisoners the opportunity to engage in "commercially rewarding work."

The "Returning Home Study" conducted by the Urban Institute from 2001 to 2006 found that ex-prisoners who worked before imprisonment, and those who find employment soon after release, are less likely to be re-incarcerated within a year of release. The same study found that releasing prisoners to parole supervision both reduces the likelihood that they will engage in substance use and makes it easier for them to find employment after release.

Programs assisting ex-offenders to find employment 

 The Safer Foundation
 Project RIO (Re-Integration of Offenders)
 The Corrections Clearinghouse
 The Center for Employment Opportunities

Housing 
In a study from New Zealand, the ability to secure stable housing was found to reduce the likeliness of recidivism by 20 percent. Housing providers struggle to make housing available to ex-offenders because of safety concerns and failure to accommodate to the specific needs of formerly individuals without guaranteed income or access to social welfare support. In New York City, "more than 54 percent of people released from prison moved straight into the city's shelter system in 2017."

Across the country, initiatives are being made to assist ex-offenders find housing.

 In Alameda County, California, homeowners are partnering with formerly incarcerated individuals and allowing them to rent. At Impact Justice, ex-offenders are paired with homeowners for housing and guidance for reintegration.
 In Delaware, a commission was created to increase access and support for Delaware state inmates to secure housing and employment.
 In Washington state, the Tacoma Housing Authority is offering housing assistance for ex-offender, at-risk college students.
 In Seattle and Washington D.C., landlords are no longer allowed to screen for felony convictions on rental applications.

Healthcare 
Other reentry programs focus on improving health among ex-prisoners, which tends to be significantly worse than that of people who have never been imprisoned. While incarcerated, prisoners face higher rates of chronic and infectious diseases, mental illness, and substance use disorders. After release, the difficulties faced during reentry exacerbate these health conditions, which is demonstrated by a link between incarceration history and poorer physical and mental health. Formerly incarcerated individuals face a lack of access to primary care services, mental health conditions, low health literacy, and difficulty obtaining medication access after release. Along with these reintegration barriers, formerly incarcerated individuals also face toxic social stress since they have to adjust to a new life and the transitional period is very unstable. The challenges reconnecting with their communities lead to a lack of social support, which is usually crucial to preventing negative health outcomes. These factors create a specific need for healthcare services during the period of reentry. A 2007 study found that, during the first two weeks after release, the risk of death for formerly incarcerated individuals was 12.7 times that of general community members.

Healthcare-focused reentry programs are designed to aid in the transition back to society,  improve health outcomes for the formerly incarcerated population, and reduce recidivism.

Healthcare reentry programs can focus on factors such as discharge planning, substance use disorder treatment, or mental health. A 2020 study evaluated three types of healthcare reentry programs: a swift, certain, fair (SCF) program for drug-involved probationers; an aftercare program for drug-involved offenders; and, a comprehensive reentry program. In the SCF approach, patients were given graduated punishments that target abstinence through frequent drug tests and monitoring, and this model was found to be less effective in reducing recidivism. The second program was a residential program of recovery homes for individuals dealing with substance use disorder. Residents live together and provide a supportive, sober social network. This program increased employment and reduced substance use, but it did not affect incarceration levels. The third program provided holistic health services through institutional caseworkers and supervision agents in the community. It provided planning, support, and direction for individuals to address their needs. This type of program was found to be most effective in reducing recidivism.

Additionally, healthcare reentry programs vary in their timing. Some begin only after release, while others begin while the individual is still incarcerated. A 2013 study evaluating best practices in healthcare-focused reentry programs found that programs that began discharge planning prior to release and were based in the individual's community were more successful in improving health outcomes. Discharge planning aids in continuity of care since individuals are transitioning from the prison healthcare system to their community healthcare system. Success of this practice was seen in the Connecticut Building Bridges Community Reentry Initiative (CRI) in 2004. The program included personal meetings with case managers months before release to discuss the individual’s goals for their health and to assess any potential risk factors for health issues after reentry. By addressing holistic health needs one month before release, the program had over 60% of its participants meet goals related to health supports and their recidivism rate was only 16%.

Since healthcare during incarceration is managed by the government, there is debate surrounding responsibility for healthcare during the reentry period. In 1976, the U.S. Supreme Court ruling in Estelle v. Gamble stated that the government has an obligation and responsibility to provide adequate medical care to the incarcerated population, but there was no mention made of responsibility for healthcare on discharge or after release. One perspective is that the government does have an obligation to ensure continuity of care after release. Another perspective is that reentry should be based in the community and supported by private providers. Private providers have greater independence to make quick decisions since they can avoid bureaucracy. Private providers are also “not constrained by civil service rules and salary scales”. One compromise position in this debate is to use government funding and grants to establish connections to private/community-based programs upon release.

Some healthcare reentry programs are independent organizations, while others are directly integrated in healthcare systems. One example of a healthcare-focused reentry program is the Transitions Clinic Network. Funding for this program is from a variety of sources, including different government funds and grants. This organization aims to build a healthcare model for individuals returning to the community from incarceration. They work with primary care clinics across the country to adopt a model of healthcare that improves health and reentry outcomes. They employ community health workers with a history of incarceration to work with patients, which helps ensure that the lived experiences of the incarcerated community are incorporated in the development of the program.

Some existing healthcare organizations and hospitals offer healthcare reentry services:

 Health Right 360
 RISE Reentry Program

Re-entry for women prisoners 
Women prisoners and formerly incarcerated women are advocating for the need for gender-specific re-entry programs in-prison and post-release, specifically focused on healthcare, substance abuse, mental illness, and family reunification.

For women prisoners concerned about family reunification post-release, comes with challenges of securing housing and employment, necessary for meeting child welfare requirements. In cases where these requirements cannot be met, women ex-offenders claim to benefit from rehabilitative counseling to deal with the strain incarceration has on the relationship between mothers and children.

Juvenile Re-entry 
Juveniles in the justice system often require different treatment and consideration than their adult counterparts. While there is constantly ongoing debate about the ways in which juvenile punishment should be given (whether it should be the same level of severity or differ in approach), often in the form of policy and moral debate, one of the most common methods of responding to juvenile offense is placing juveniles in re-entry programs.

Juvenile Reentry is a culmination of services, often presented in the form of programs, that help to reintegrate displaced juveniles back into the community. These programs are often designed to discourage juvenile delinquency and prevent such crimes from happening again.

Juvenile Re-entry programs involve many stages with each stage playing its own role in helping the juvenile to reform. There is the entry phase, placement phase, transitional phase, and community-based aftercare phase. Each of these stages involves varying degrees of supervision over the juvenile while the delinquent is given safer surroundings and taught valuable lessons and ways of life that ultimately will help them to be a more valuable and safe addition to the community.

See also

 Collateral consequences of criminal conviction
 United States incarceration rate
 Incarceration in the United States
 Incarceration prevention in the United States
Incarceration of women in the United States
Penal labor in the United States
Prison healthcare

References

Further reading

 

Penal system in the United States